A list of notable Ukrainian statesmen and politicians:

Major statesmen
Dmytro Antonovych, Minister of naval affairs, and of arts of the Ukrainian People's Republic (1917–1918 and 1918/19)
Mykola Azarov, Prime Minister of Ukraine (2010–2014)
Volodymyr Bahaziy, the head of Kiev City Administration under German occupation (October 1941 - January 1942)
Ivan Bahrianyi, President (acting) of the UNR in exile (1965–1967)
Stepan Bandera, leader of the Organization of Ukrainian Nationalists (OUN-B)
Oleksander Barvinsky, leader of the Christian Social Movement in Ukraine
Vyacheslav Chornovil, leader of the People's Movement of Ukraine
Dmytro Dontsiv, Ukrainian nationalist writer, publisher, journalist and political thinker
Dmytro Doroshenko, Minister for Foreign Affairs of the Hetmanate (1918)
Sydir Holubovych, Prime Minister of the West Ukrainian National Republic (1919)
Vsevolod Holubovych, Prime Minister of the Ukrainian People's Republic (1918)
Volodymyr Horbulin, Secretary of National Security and Defense Council (1994–1999, 2006)
Mykhaylo Hrushevsky, President of the Ukrainian People's Republic
Ivan Hrynokh, Vice President of the Ukrainian Supreme Liberation Council
Stepan Klochurak, Prime Minister of the Hutsul Republic (1919)
Yevhen Konovalets, leader of the Organization of Ukrainian Nationalists (1929–1938)
Leonyd Kravchuk, President of Ukraine (1991–1994)
Volodymyr Kubiyovych, geographer and politician (Ukrainian Central Committee)
Leonyd Kuchma, President of Ukraine (1994–2005)
Viktor Kurmanovych, State Secretary of Armed Forces of the West Ukrainian People's Republic (1919)
Mykola Lebed, the head of the Security Service for the UPA
Dmytro Levytsky, the head of the Ukrainian National Democratic Alliance (UNDO) (1925–1935)
Kost Levytsky, Prime Minister of the West Ukrainian National Republic (1918/19)
Andriy Livytskyi, President of the Ukrainian People's Republic in exile (1926–1954).
Mykola Livytskyi, President of the Ukrainian People's Republic in exile (1967–1989).
Vyacheslav Lypynsky, leader of the Ukrainian Democratic-Agrarian Party
Nestor Makhno, leader of anarchists
Isaak Mazepa, Prime Minister of the Ukrainian People's Republic (1919–1920 and 1948–1952)
Andriy Melnyk, leader of the Organization of Ukrainian Nationalists (OUN-M)
Volodymyr Ohryzko, Minister for Foreign Affairs (2007–2009)
Symon Petlura, President of the Ukrainian People's Republic
Yevhen Petrushevych, President of the West Ukrainian National Republic
Mykola Plaviuk, President of the Ukrainian People's Republic in exile (1989–1992)
Vyacheslav Prokopovych, Prime Minister of the Ukrainian People's Republic (1920, 1921, 1926–1939)
Lev Rebet, Acting Prime Minister of the Independent Ukrainian Republic (1941)
Pavlo Shandruk, the head of the Ukrainian National Committee in Weimar (1945)
Pavlo Skoropadsky, Hetman of Ukraine or head of the Hetmanate (1918)
Yaroslav Stetsko, Prime Minister of the Independent Ukrainian Republic (1941)
Slava Stetsko, leader of the Ukrainian nationalist movement
Kyryl Studynsky, the head of the People's Assembly of Western Ukraine (1939)
Borys Tarasyuk, Minister for Foreign Affairs (1998–2000 and 2005–2007)
Serhiy Tihipko, Minister of Economics (2000)
Yulia Tymoshenko, Prime Minister of Ukraine (2007–2010)
Anatole Vakhnianyn, leader of the Christian Social Movement in Ukraine
Avhustyn Voloshyn, President of Carpatho-Ukraine (1939)
Volodymyr Vynnychenko, Prime Minister of the Ukrainian People's Republic, writer
Stepan Vytvytskyi, President of the Ukrainian People's Republic in exile (1954–1965)
Volodymyr Yaniv, a member of the Ukrainian National Committee in Kraków (1941)
Arseniy Yatsenyuk, Minister for Foreign Affairs (2007)
Serhiy Yefremov, the deputy head of the Central Council of Ukraine (1917)
Viktor Yushchenko, President of Ukraine (2005–2010)
Viktor Yanukovych, President of Ukraine (2010–2014)
Oleksandr Turchynov, President of Ukraine (acting) (23 February 2014 – 7 June 2014)
Petro Poroshenko, President of Ukraine (2014–2019)
Volodymyr Zelenskyy, President of Ukraine (2019-Present)

Politicians

A
Alexander Abdullin
Alla Aleksandrovska
Igor Alekseyev (Ukrainian MP)
Irina Akimova
Vladimir Ar'yev
Stanislav Arzhevitin
Nurulislam Arkallayev
Karekin Arutyunov	
Rinat Akhmetov
Mykola Azarov

B
Oleh Babayev
Valery Babenko
Aleksey Baburin
Nikolay Bagrayev
Volodymyr Bahaziy
Tatyana Bakhteeva
Viktor Baloha
Valery Baranov
Vitaly Barvinenko
Oleksandr Bazylyuk
Aleksey Bely
Irina Belousova
Irina Berezhna
Valery Bevz
Valery Bevzenko
Roman Bezsmertnyi
Oksana Bilozir
Raisa Bogatyrova
Inna Bohoslovska
Yevgenia Bosch
Bohdan Boyko
Mikhaylo Brodsky
Sergiy Bubka

C
Leonid Chernovetskyi
Andriy Chornovil
Taras Chornovіl
Viacheslav Chornovil
Vlas Chubar

D
Lyudmyla Denisova
Ivan Drach
Ihor Drizhchany
Vasyl Durdynets
Mustafa Dzhemilev

F
Vіtold Fokіn
Ivan Franko

H
Vadym Hetman
Anatoliy Hrytsenko
Vasyl Humenyuk

I
Volodymyr Ivashko

K
Nina Karpachova
Anatoliy Kinakh
Ivan Kyrylenko
Vyacheslav Kyrylenko
Borys Kolesnikov
Vitaliy Kononov
Valeriy Konovalyuk
Dmytro Korchynskyy
Natalia Korolevska
Demyan Korotchenko
Yuriy Kostenko
Leonid Kravchuk
Leonid Kuchma

L
Pavlo Lazarenko
Levko Lukyanenko
Yuriy Lutsenko
Volodymyr Lytvyn

M
Volodymyr Marchenko
Yevhen Marchuk
Vitaliy Masol
Viktor Medvedchuk
Oleksandr Medvedko
Oleksandr Moroz
Oleksandr Morozov
Oleksiy Mustafin

N
Yevhen Neronovych
Andriy Nikolayenko

O
Oleksandr Ohloblyn
Oleksandr Omelchenko

P
Oleksandr Pabat
Andriy Parubiy
Valeriy Pustovoytenko
Petro Pysarchuk

R
Oleg Ryabokon

T
Dmytro Tabachnyk
Boris Tarasyuk
Olena Teliha
Sergei Tigipko
Yulia Tymoshenko
Oleksandr Tkachenko
Mykola Tomenko
Oleksandr Turchynov
Oleh Tyahnybok

U
Hennadiy Udovenko

V
Alina Vedmid
Nataliya Vitrenko
Vasil Volga

Y
Viktor Yanukovych
Ihor Yukhnovskyi
Yuriy Yekhanurov
Viktor Yushchenko

Z
Vitaliy Zholobov
Oleksandr Zinchenko
Yukhym Zvyahilsky

External links

Biographies of some Ukrainian politicians by ICTV